Entangled may refer to:

 Entangled state, in physics, a state arising from quantum entanglement
 Entangled (film), a 1993 film starring Judd Nelson and Pierce Brosnan
 Entangled (Partington), a 2004 abstract sculpture created by Brose Partington
 "Entangled" (song), a song by Genesis from the 1976 album A Trick of the Tail
 "Entangled" (Red Dwarf), the fourth episode of series 10 of the science fiction sitcom Red Dwarf

See also 

Entanglement (disambiguation)
Entangling alliances
Tangled (disambiguation)